The 67th Regiment Indiana Infantry was an infantry regiment that served in the Union Army during the American Civil War.

Service
The 67th Indiana Infantry was organized at Madison, Indiana and mustered in for a three-year enlistment on August 20, 1862, under the command of Colonel Frank Emerson.

The regiment was attached to 1st Brigade, 2nd Division, Army of Kentucky, Department of the Ohio. 1st Brigade, 10th Division, Right Wing, XIII Corps, Department of the Tennessee, December 1862. 1st Brigade, 1st Division, Sherman's Yazoo Expedition, to January 1863. 1st Brigade, 10th Division, XIII Corps, Army of the Tennessee, to August 1863. 1st Brigade, 4th Division, XIII Corps, Department of the Gulf, to June 1864. 3rd Brigade, 3rd Division, XIX Corps, Department of the Gulf, to December 1864. 2nd Brigade, Reserve Division, Military Division West Mississippi, December 1864.

The 67th Indiana Infantry ceased to exist on December 21, 1864, when it was consolidated with the 24th Indiana Infantry.

Casualties
The regiment lost a total of 249 men during service; 1 officer and 52 enlisted men killed or mortally wounded, 2 officers and 194 enlisted men died of disease.

Commanders
 Colonel Frank Emerson
 Lieutenant Colonel Theodore E. Buehler - commanded at the battle of Champion Hill and during the siege of Vicksburg

See also

 List of Indiana Civil War regiments
 Indiana in the Civil War

References
 Benton, Richard J. Echoes of the 67th (Las Vegas, NV: Paper Tigers Pub.), 2002.  
 Dyer, Frederick H. A Compendium of the War of the Rebellion (Des Moines, IA: Dyer Pub. Co.), 1908.
 McMillan, William A. Campaigning With the 67th Indiana 1864: An Annotated Diary of Service in the Department of the Gulf (New York:  iUniverse), 2006.  
 Scott, Reuben B. The History of the 67th Regiment Indiana Infantry Volunteers, War of the Rebellion (Bedford, IN: Herald Book and Job Print.), 1892.
 Woodworth, Steven E. (ed.). The Musick of the Mocking Birds, the Roar of the Cannon: The Civil War Diary and Letters of William Winters (Lincoln, NE:  University of Nebraska Press), 1998.  
Attribution

External links
 67th Indiana Infantry monument at Vicksburg

Military units and formations established in 1862
Military units and formations disestablished in 1864
1864 disestablishments in Indiana
Units and formations of the Union Army from Indiana
1862 establishments in Indiana